Mirza Mohammad Khan Davallu Qajar also known as Kashikchi Bashi and then Sepahsalar (death 1867) was the Grand Vizier of Persia during the reign of Naser al-Din Shah Qajar.

Life 

Mirza Mohammad Khan, the son of Amir Khan Sardar, was a soldier during the reign of Mohammad Shah Qajar. He inherited the title of Kashikchi Bashi from his father. During the British military invasion of southern Iran, he was chosen to replace Mehr Ali Khan Shuja al-Mulk Nouri, commander of the southern forces, who had been defeated by the British, but could not do anything against him. In 1863 he suppressed the Turkmens uprising in Astarabad and was appointed Minister of Defense as a reward. A year later, Nasser al-Din Shah was appointed Minister of War, retaining the position of Minister of War. At his initiative, the first military manual in Iran was approved and implemented, based on the guidelines of the British and French armies. The program set out the method of appointing and dismissing command staff, scheduling compulsory military exercises, and establishing a trained reserve to introduce a specific organizational structure. Prime Minister Mirza Mohammad Khan lasted 17 months and because he was a military man, he mainly paid attention to the troops and was oblivious to the affairs of the country. In addition, courtiers and ministers appointed by the Shah disregarded his orders and were accountable only to the Shah. Eventually, he was ousted and exiled to Mashhad by the conspiracies of Mirza Yusuf Ashtiani and other courtiers.

After the death of Mirza Yusuf Khan, Mirza Muhammad, along with a number of Nasser al-Din Shah's opponents, conspired to overthrow him and succeed his brother Abdol-samad Mirza Ezz ed-Dowleh Saloor. Nasser al-Din Shah realized this conspiracy and during a trip to Mashhad ordered the poisoning of Mirza Mohammad Khan with Qajar coffee. Mirza Mohammad Khan Sepahsalar died three days after Nasser al-Din Shah returned to Tehran in 1867.

Mirza Mohammad Khan had sons named Amir Mehdi Khan, Mohammad Nasr Khan, and Hussein Khan.

References 

People from Gorgan
1867 deaths
Prime Ministers of Iran
Deaths by poisoning
19th-century Iranian politicians
People of Qajar Iran